Mutundwe is a neighborhood in the town of Ssabagabo in Uganda. The name also refers to Mutundwe Hill, where the neighborhood is located.

Location
Mutundwe is located in the northwestern edge of Ssabagabo municipality in Wakiso District, in Uganda's Central Region. It is bordered by Lungujja to the north, Lubaga to the northeast, Ndeeba and Kabowa to the east, Wankulukuku to the east, Kitebi to the southeast, Kabojja to the west, and Nateete to the northwest. The coordinates of Mutundwe are 0°16'58.0"N, 32°32'03.0"E (Latitude:0.282778; Longitude:32.534167).

Overview
During the first decade of the 21st century, educational institutions such as the Mutundwe Campus of Kampala University and Victoria Academy Mutundwe Primary School have been added to the neighborhood.

The Mutundwe Power Station, a 50 megawatt thermal power plant, was dismantled in 2011, but the Mutundwe electricity sub-station, where the power plant was located, still exists. This sub-station is a major transit point for power evacuated from the hydropower stations along the Nile River before it is transmitted to Entebbe, Masaka, and the Western Region.

Parts of Mutundwe Hill lie in Lubaga Division, within the city of Kampala, Uganda's capital. Other parts lie in the newly created town of Ssabagabo in Wakiso District. Still other parts of the hill lie within unincorporated Wakiso District.

See also
 Godfrey Binaisa
 Kampala Capital City Authority

References

External links
 Missionaries of "The Brothers from Our Lady of Good Counsel" In Mutundwe Bring Hope to Kisenyi’s Poor

Populated places in Central Region, Uganda
Wakiso District
Ssabagabo